Ahad HaAm High School, located in Petah Tikva, Israel is named after Asher Zvi Hirsch Ginsberg, primarily known by his Hebrew name and pen name, Ahad HaAm, (lit. one of the people, Genesis 26:10).

The high school won the National Education Award for 2010 from the Israeli Ministry of Education in recognition of its excellence in education and outstanding matriculation rate – 95.32%.

The high school campus also houses the Open University's Petah Tikva College.

It is being currently led by principal Anat Arnon.

In September 2013 an adjacent junior high was founded, also named Ahad HaAm, with students continuing from the junior high to the high school.

The school is well known for its World Scholar's Cup delegations, most recently winning the best overall team award at the Prague Global Round.

References

External links 
Ahad Ha'am High School website

High schools in Israel
Educational institutions established in 1959
1959 establishments in Israel
Buildings and structures in Petah Tikva